Dolophron is a genus of parasitoid wasps belonging to the family Ichneumonidae.

The species of this genus are found in Europe.

Species:
 Dolophron nemorati Horstmann, 1978 
 Dolophron pedella (Holmgren, 1860)

References

Ichneumonidae
Ichneumonidae genera